Klevan Castle (Клеванський замок) is one of the oldest forts in Volynia, Ukraine. It was built in the mid-15th century by Prince Michael Czartoryski in order to control a ford over the Stubla River. Klevan was the main seat of the Orthodox princely house of Chortoryisk until its members converted to Catholicism in the 17th century. After that the castle was given to a Jesuit school. After the partitions of Poland the castle was confiscated by the Habsburgs, and stood untenanted. Its western wall was pulled down in the 19th century. The remaining portions include two towers, three fortified buildings, and a high four-arched bridge leading to the main gate.

References 
 Памятники градостроительства и архитектуры Украинской ССР. Киев: Будивельник, 1983–1986. Том 3, с. 328.

External links 
 

Castles in Ukraine
Buildings and structures in Rivne Oblast
Czartoryski family